Bar Marco is a restaurant and bar located in the Strip District of Pittsburgh, Pennsylvania.  It was named one of the Top 50 Best New Restaurants by Bon Appétit Magazine, and was added to Thrillist’s Top 33 Cocktails Bars in the USA. Since 2013, it has been included on Pittsburgh Magazine’s Best Restaurants every year excluding 2016.

Bar Marco was founded in 2011 by Kevin Cox, Justin Steel, Michael Kreha, and Bobby Fry.

Bar Marco received extensive media coverage when it announced the decision to eliminate tipping and instead pay its employees a $35,000 yearly salary.

References

External links
 Official website
 Bar Marco at Bon Appétit

Restaurants in Pittsburgh
2011 establishments in Pennsylvania
Restaurants established in 2011